Courson-les-Carrières is a commune in the Yonne department in Bourgogne-Franche-Comté in north-central France. It is the largest single settlement in the natural region of Forterre.

The commune covers 20,364 hectares of which 4937 is woodland and extends to Frétoy Forest. It is on the Portland limestone plateau, and the distinctive local stone is seen in the buildings of the region. A well in Courson gives access to the deepest cave of the Yonne – the Gouffre de Villepot – at 48m depth.

The Town Hall occupies a nineteenth century manor house in the central square.

Distinguished former residents of Courson include the royal tailor Auguste François Dussautoy (1810–1873) and the photographer René Prouho (1879–1970). Courson added the Carrieres suffix in 1878. It had 1400 inhabitants in 1880.

See also
Communes of the Yonne department

References

Communes of Yonne